The 1979–80 FC Bayern Munich season was the club's 15th season in the Bundesliga.

Review and events
Bayern Munich won the national championship while being eliminated in the third round of the DFB-Pokal and semi-finals of the UEFA Cup.

Match results

Legend

Bundesliga

DFB-Pokal

UEFA Cup

First round

Second round

Round of 16

Quarterfinals

Semifinals

References

FC Bayern Munich seasons
Bayern Munich
German football championship-winning seasons